The Institute for Mathematics and its Applications located at the University of Minnesota is an organization established in 1982 by the National Science Foundation (NSF) of the United States.

Mission
The primary mission of the IMA is to increase the impact of mathematics by fostering interdisciplinary research and linking mathematics  and scientific and technological problems from other disciplines and industry.

Activities
The IMA hosts long-term visitors, funds postdoctoral research positions, and holds several conferences annually. The NSF has granted the IMA $19.5 million over the period 2005–2010, the largest single mathematics grant the NSF has ever awarded.

Prize in Mathematics and its Applications

The IMA annually awards a prize to a mathematician who has received their PhD within the last 10 years. This award recognizes an individual who has made a transformative impact on the mathematical sciences and their applications.

 2019: Jacob Bedrossian
 2018: Anders C. Hansen
 2017: Jianfeng Lu
 2016: Rachel Ward and Deanna Needell
 2015: Jonathan Weare
 2014: David F. Anderson

Organization with similar names
Sharing a very similar name and the acronym IMA, it should not be confused with the Institute of Mathematics and its Applications, a professional body for mathematicians in the UK.

References
IMA Celebrates 20 Prodigious Years, SIAM News, October 31, 2003.

Notes

External links
Institute for Mathematics and its Applications

Mathematical institutes
University of Minnesota
Research institutes established in 1982
Research institutes in Minnesota
National Science Foundation mathematical sciences institutes
1982 establishments in Minnesota